Daniel Halangahu is a professional rugby union assistant coach for North Harbour Rugby Union in the Mitre 10 Cup competition. He is a former professional player and played primarily as a five eighth and retired in 2015. He is also currently assistant coach for the Auckland Blues.

Personal life
Halangahu was born 6 March 1984 in Belmont, New South Wales. He grew up in Yass NSW, the small town 30 mins outside of Canberra  He is of Tongan descent. He has an older sister Trish and an older brother Antonio who is club captain at Randwick RFC. Daniel is married to Nadia Marsh.

Early life
Daniel attended Daramalan College in Canberra before attending The King's School, Sydney, along with fellow Waratahs Benn Robinson, Dean Mumm, Will Caldwell. He played in The King's School 1st XV rugby team in 2002, which won the GPS title that year.

Representative rugby
In 2008, Halangahu was selected for Australia A to play in the Pacific Nations Cup.

References

External links
 Waratahs profile
 itsrugby.co.uk profile
 Zebre Squad Index
 North Harbour coaches profiles
 

1984 births
Living people
Australian rugby union players
New South Wales Waratahs players
Zebre Parma players
North Harbour rugby union players
Australian sportspeople of Tongan descent
Rugby union fly-halves
Australian expatriate rugby union players
Expatriate rugby union players in Italy
Expatriate rugby union players in New Zealand
Australian expatriate sportspeople in Italy
Australian expatriate sportspeople in France
Rugby union players from Newcastle, New South Wales